The Judith River is a tributary of the Missouri River, approximately 124 mi (200 km) long, running through central Montana in the United States. It rises in the Little Belt Mountains and flows northeast past Utica and Hobson. It is joined by Dry Wolf Creek in northern Fergus County, and itself joins the Missouri in the White Cliffs Area approximately 18 mi (29 km) northwest of Winifred.

The river gives its name to the Judith River Group of the late Cretaceous, a notable area for excavation of dinosaur fossils that stretches from Montana into southeastern Alberta and southwestern Saskatchewan. The river was named by William Clark. William Clark came across a stream which he considered particularly clear and pretty, and named it the Judith River, in honor of his cousin Julia Hancock.
It is also known for its large amount of Cretaceous dinosaur fossils, including those of Tyrannosaurus, Styracosaurus and Edmontosaurus.

The Judith is a Class I river from the confluence with Big Spring Creek to its confluence with the Missouri River for public access for recreational purposes.

History
The Crow tribe called this waterway Buluhpa’ashe (“Plum River”). Capt. Meriwether Lewis named this central Montana river the Bighorn. On May 20, 1805, Capt. William Clark renamed it in honor of his future wife, Julia (Judith) Hancock. Beginning in the 1880s, the area surrounding the Judith River at Judith Landing was home to two large ranching operations: the DHS Ranch of A.J. and Erwin Davis, Samuel T. Hauser, and Granville Stuart; and the PN Ranch of Thomas C. Power and G.R. Norris.

White Eagle, "the last major Chief of the Gros Ventre people", died "at the mouth of the Judith River" on February 9, 1881.

See also

List of rivers of Montana
Montana Stream Access Law
 Upper Missouri River National Monument

External links
Montana relief map showing Judith River
Additional Information and Photos of the Judith River
Montana Historical Society

Notes

Rivers of Montana
Tributaries of the Missouri River
Rivers of Fergus County, Montana
Rivers of Judith Basin County, Montana